Interleukin 37 (IL-37), also known as Interleukin-1 family member 7 (IL-1F7), is an anti-inflammatory cytokine important for the downregulation of pro-inflammatory cytokine production as well as the suppression of tumor cell growth.

Gene location and structure 
The IL-37 gene is in the human located on the long chromosome arm of chromosome 2. There has not been found any homolog gene in mice genome. IL-37 undergoes alternative splicing with 5 different splice variants depending on which of the 6 possible exons are being expressed: IL-37a-e. IL-37b is the largest and most studied one; it shares the beta barrel structure that is spread within the interleukin-1 family.

Gene expression 
IL-37a,b,c are being expressed in a variety of tissues - thymus, lung, colon, uterus, bone marrow. It is produced by immune cells, most of which are relevant to the immune inflammation response. Examples include natural killer cells, activated B lymphocytes, circulating blood monocytes, tissue macrophages, keratinocytes or epithelial cells.

Some IL-37 isoforms are tissue specific and have varying lengths depending on which exons are being expressed:

IL-37a is found in the brain. The isoform includes exons 3, 4, 5, and 6 and the isoform is 192 amino acids in length

IL-37b is found in the kidney, bone marrow, blood, skin, respiratory and urogenital tract. Exons 1, 2, 4, 5, and 6 are expressed and the isoform is 218 amino acids in length.

IL-37c is found in the heart, and contains exons 1, 2, 5, and 6 for a total amino acid length of 197.

IL-37d is found in the bone marrow and includes exons 1, 4, 5,  and 6 for a total length of 197.

IL-37e is found in the testis and includes exons 1, 5, and 6 totaling 157 amino acids.

Function 
The mechanism of IL-37 functions is still to be elucidated. Known functions of IL-37 include anti-inflammatory effects, tumor suppression, and antimicrobial responses. IL-37 acts intracellulary and extracellulary, classifying the cytokine as dual-function.

IL-37 Synthesis 
IL-37, similar to other members of the interleukin-1 family, is synthesized by blood monocytes in a precursor form and secreted into the cytoplasm in response to inflammatory signaling. Examples of relevant inflammatory signals include TLR agonists, IL-1β, or TGF-β. Full maturation requires cleavage by Caspase-1.

Immune System Inhibition 
IL-37 is known to have immunosuppression properties through two different binding mechanisms:

Interaction with IL-18 cell surface receptors - Intracellular IL-37 can be released from cells following necrosis or apoptosis. IL-37 has two similar amino acid residues with IL-18, and thus extracellular IL-37 can interact with IL-18 receptor (IL-18R) and co-receptor IL-1 receptor 8 (IL-1R8). The affinity of IL-37b to IL-18R alpha subunit is much lower compared to IL-18. IL-37b interacts with IL-18 binding protein (IL-18BP), that is an antagonist of IL-18. The binding of IL-37b enhances the IL-18BP functions and can upregulate anti-inflammatory signals.

Binding to SMAD3 receptor - Mature intracellular IL-37 can form functional complexes with phosphorylated or unphosphorylated Smad3,which can be transported to the cell nucleus. Nucleus IL-37 can have a direct inhibition function on the expression of pro-inflammatory cytokine gene transcription. Affected cytokines include IL-1β, IFN-γ, IL-6, and TNF-α.

Tumor-Controlled Expression 
IL-37 functions are active at low IL-37 concentrations. Higher concentrations leads to inactivation via dimer formation. Experiments also show that certain cancer strains correspond to changes in IL-37 expression levels. Breast cancer and ovarian cancer are associated with elevated expression of IL-37. Colon cancer, lung cancer, Multiple Myeloma, and Hepatoma Carcinoma were correlated with decreased expression of IL-37 expression in affected areas.

See also 
 Interleukin-1 family
 Interleukin 18
 Interleukin 18 receptor
 Interleukin 18 binding protein
 Inflammation
 Carcinogenesis

References

Further reading

External links